Stewart G. Honeck (December 25, 1906 – March 27, 1999) was an American lawyer and politician from Wisconsin.

Born in Chicago, Illinois, Honeck graduated from high school in Milwaukee, Wisconsin. He graduated from Marquette University Law School and was deputy attorney general in the United States Department of Justice. A Republican, Honeck was elected Wisconsin Attorney General in 1956 serving from 1957 to 1959. He died in Fort Myers, Florida.

Notes

Lawyers from Chicago
Politicians from Milwaukee
Marquette University Law School alumni
Wisconsin Attorneys General
Wisconsin Republicans
1906 births
1999 deaths
20th-century American politicians
Lawyers from Milwaukee
20th-century American lawyers